Franc Lena (born 3 July 2000) is an Albanian footballer who plays as a defender for Kastrioti in the Kategoria Superiore.

Career

Kastrioti
In January 2020, Lena joined the club fresh out of the Shkëndija youth academy. He made his league debut on 28 June 2020, coming on as a halftime substitute for Sokol Neziri in a 2-2 away draw with Erzeni.

References

External links
Franc Lena at UEFA Youth League

2000 births
Living people
KS Kastrioti players
Kategoria e Parë players
Albanian footballers
Association football defenders